The Cable Street Mural is a large mural painting in Shadwell in East London. It was painted on the side of St George's Town Hall by Dave Binnington, Paul Butler, Ray Walker and Desmond Rochfort between 1979 and 1983 to commemorate the Battle of Cable Street in 1936. The original design was by Dave Binnington.

Background

The Battle of Cable Street took place on Sunday 4 October 1936 in Cable Street, as a result of opposition to a march by the British Union of Fascists led by Oswald Mosley. Anti-fascist protesters, including local Jewish, socialist, anarchist, Irish and communist groups, clashed with the Metropolitan Police, who attempted to remove the barricades erected to stop the march.

Creation
Planning for the mural began in 1976, when Dan Jones, Secretary of the Tower Hamlets Trades Council, saw the Royal Oaks Mural under the Westway in west London, and asked the artist, Dave Binnington, to paint a mural in Cable Street.

A grant from the Arts Council allowed Binnington to undertake research before a public meeting in October 1978 to unveil his design. The local population were generally supportive, although a letter to a local paper described the proposed mural as "political graffiti". Binnington also recruited Paul Butler to design the lower section. Many of the faces in the mural were inspired by newspaper pictures of people who took part in the battle.

Funding from Greater London Arts Association, the E. Vincent Harris Fund for Mural Decoration, the Gulbenkian Foundation, the Leonard Cohen Trust, Greater London Council and the Royal Academy allowed work to start.

Binnington began painting in late 1979 with a targeted completion date of October 1980. He found it more complicated and time-consuming than expected, and work continued through 1980 and 1981. The uncompleted mural was vandalised on 23 May 1982, when right-wing slogans were painted on lower parts of the wall. Binnington abandoned the project in disgust. He later became a furniture designer, and adopted his wife's surname to become David Savage.

Work resumed in July 1982 with Paul Butler helped by Ray Walker and Desmond Rochfort (who had worked with Binnington before on the Royal Oaks Mural). The top was completed to Binnington's design, and the vandalised lower portions were sand-blasted and repainted to a modified design. The mural was completed in March 1983 and officially unveiled on 7 May 1983 by Paul Beasley, Leader of Tower Hamlets Council, with Jack Jones (former General Secretary of the Transport and General Workers Union), Tony Banks (Chair of the Greater London Council Arts Committee) and Dan Jones.

The mural has been vandalised and restored several times, and was restored again by Butler for the 75th anniversary of the Battle of Cable Street in October 2011.

Mural
The artists used  of paint, at a cost of £18,000.

The work is inspired by the social realism of Diego Rivera. Using a fisheye perspective, it shows the violent confrontation between police and protesters, with protest banners, punches being thrown, a barricade of furniture and overturned vehicle, police horse, and a police autogyro overhead. It uses the same artistic devices as Goya's The Third of May 1808 to evince sympathy for the protesters, showing them full face but a back view of the police.

References

External links
 The Battle of Cable Street – 75 Years On, History Workshop Online, 8 January 2011
 View the Cable Street Mural, Tired of London, Tired of Life, 14 April 2010
  Hidden London: The Real Battle of Cable Street, WORLDbytes
 Does Cable Street still matter?, BBC News, 4 October 2006
 Cable Street mural, Socialist Unity, 21 October 2011

1978 murals
1978 paintings
1980s murals
1983 paintings
Buildings and structures in the London Borough of Tower Hamlets
Murals in London
Shadwell